Gibraltar Hill is a hill in the Monaro region, near   in New South Wales, Australia.

Murrumbidgee to Googong Water Transfer pipeline
The Murrumbidgee to Googong Water Transfer pipeline passes through the Gibraltar Range (also known as the Gibraltar Pass), south of Gibraltar Hill. Construction of the  pipeline began in 2008 and was completed in 2012.

See also

 Mount Gibraltar
 Gibraltar Hill (disambiguation)

References

Mountains of New South Wales
Hills of New South Wales